is part of the Akaishi Mountains on the border of Shizuoka and Nagano prefectures in Japan.

Outline
The mountain's peak just exceeds the tree line, and Siberian Dwarf Pines and other alpine plants can be found on its southern face. This mountain is the southernmost point at which Siberian Dwarf Pines can be found throughout the world.

References

Akaishi Mountains
Japan Alps
Mountains of Nagano Prefecture
Mountains of Shizuoka Prefecture